The Australian Economic History Review: An Asia-Pacific Journal of Economic, Business, & Social History is a peer-reviewed academic journal with social-scientific analyses, principally of Pacific-Asian economic history. It is published three times a year by Wiley-Blackwell on behalf of the Economic History Society of Australia and New Zealand. It was established in 1961 and is edited by Stephen Morgan, John Singleton, Martin Shanahan, and Lionel Frost.

Indexing and abstracting 
The journal is indexed and abstracted in ProQuest, CSA Environmental Sciences & Pollution Management Database, Historical Abstracts, International Bibliography of the Social Sciences, Journal of Economic Literature/EconLit, Public Affairs Information Service, RePEc, Scopus, Social Sciences Citation Index, and Worldwide Political Sciences Abstracts. According to the Journal Citation Reports, the journal has a 2012 impact factor of 0.355, ranking it 18th out of 33 journals in the category "History of Social Sciences" and 260th out of 332 in the category "Economics".

References

External links 
 
 The Economic History Society of Australia and New Zealand

Economic history journals
Publications established in 1961
Wiley-Blackwell academic journals
English-language journals
Triannual journals